Aberdeen Proving Ground is a census-designated place (CDP) covering the residential population of the Aberdeen Proving Ground in Harford County, Maryland, United States. The population at the 2020 Census was 1,668.

Demographics

2020 census

Note: the US Census treats Hispanic/Latino as an ethnic category. This table excludes Latinos from the racial categories and assigns them to a separate category. Hispanics/Latinos can be of any race.

2000 Census
As of the census of 2000, there were 3,116 people, 805 households, and 763 families residing in the CDP. The racial makeup of the CDP was 50.5% White, 34.6% African American, 0.6% Native American, 3.1% Asian, 1.3% Pacific Islander, 5.7% from other races, and 4.2% from two or more races; 11.2% of the population were Hispanic or Latino of any race.

In the CDP, the population was spread out, with 40.1% under the age of 18, 10.3% from 18 to 24, 44.9% from 25 to 44, 4.4% from 45 to 64, and 0.2% who were 65 years of age or older. The median age was 25 years. For every 100 females, there were 113.9 males. For every 100 females age 18 and over, there were 117.6 males.

The median income for a household in the CDP was $38,875, and the median income for a family was $40,306. Males had a median income of $26,943 versus $26,194 for females. The per capita income for the CDP was $12,808. About 4.2% of families and 5.6% of the population were below the poverty line, including 6.4% of those under age 18 and none of those age 65 or over.

References

Census-designated places in Harford County, Maryland